The 2018 British Champions Series, sponsored by QIPCO, was the eighth edition of the horse racing series comprising 35 of the UK's top flat races. The series began with the 2,000 Guineas at Newmarket on 5 May, and ended with British Champions Day at Ascot on 20 October.

Results

The series was split into five categories: Sprint, Mile, Middle Distance, Long Distance and Fillies & Mares. Each category included seven races.

Sprint

Mile

Middle Distance

Long Distance

Fillies & Mares

Standings

Horses were ranked according to their official BHA performance ratings in British Champions Series races during the season. Jockeys and trainers were ranked according to the number of wins, second places and third places they achieved during the series.

Horses

Jockeys

Trainers

See also

2018 Breeders' Cup Challenge series

References

External links

Official website

British Champions Series
British Champions Series
British Champions Series